Revolution is a 1985 British historical drama film directed by Hugh Hudson, written by Robert Dillon, and starring Al Pacino, Donald Sutherland, and Nastassja Kinski. The film stars Pacino as a fur trapper in the Province of New York who involuntarily gets enrolled in the Revolutionary forces during the American Revolutionary War.

Revolution received a great deal of negative reviews upon release, and was a box-office bomb; its release was delayed in Pacino's native New York City. Due to the disappointment, Pacino took a four-year hiatus from films until 1989's Sea of Love.

Plot
Fur trapper Tom Dobb reluctantly participates in the American Revolutionary War after his young son Ned joins the Army as a drummer boy against his father's wishes. Later, his son is captured by the British, and taken by the strict Sergeant Major Peasy to replace dead British drummer boys. Dobb attempts to find him, and along the way, he becomes convinced that he must help fight for the freedom of the Thirteen Colonies, alongside the disgraced and idealistic aristocrat Daisy McConnahay.

Cast

 Al Pacino as Tom Dobb
 Donald Sutherland as Sgt. Maj. Peasy
 Nastassja Kinski as Daisy McConnahay
 Dexter Fletcher as Ned Dobb
 Sid Owen as Young Ned Dobb
 Joan Plowright as Mrs. McConnahay
 Dave King as Mr. McConnahay
 Steven Berkoff as Sgt. Jones
 John Wells as Corty
 Annie Lennox as Liberty Woman
 Richard O'Brien as Lord Hampton
 Pietro Giovanni Lantrua as Impoverished Extra
 Paul Brooke as Lord Darling
 Frank Windsor as Gen. Washington
 Jesse Birdsall as Cpl./Sgt. Peasy
 Larry Sellers as Honchwah
 Graham Greene as Ongwata
 Robbie Coltrane as New York Burgher
Robert "Jack" Frost as Marching British Soldier Extra

Development
The film was the idea of producer Irwin Winkler who felt the American Revolution would make an ideal subject for a film. After having just made The Right Stuff, based on a true story, Winkler decided to focus on a fictional father and son. Winkler had a development deal at Warner Bros., and the studio agreed to finance a script by Robert Dillon. Warners did not like the script and didn't agree to finance it, so Winkler bought it back, attached Hugh Hudson as director and took the project to other studios to see if they were interested. He showed the script to Sandy Lieberson of Goldcrest, who was enthusiastic.

Goldcrest agreed to finance provided a U.S. studio could be brought in to co-produce. Warner Bros. then agreed.

Production
The movie was filmed largely in the old dock area of the English port town of King's Lynn, Norfolk. The main battles scenes were filmed at Burrator Reservoir on Dartmoor in Devon and on the coastal cliff top near Challaborough Bay, South Devon where a wooden fort was built. Military extras were recruited from ex-servicemen mainly from the Plymouth area. Many other scenes were filmed in the battle training area near Thetford, Norfolk, and extras were recruited from the King's Lynn area. Melton Constable Hall in Norfolk was used for some scenes.

Reception

Box office
Revolution cost $28 million to make, and it was a box-office disaster, grossing $346,761 in the United States.

Goldcrest Films invested £15,603,000 in the film and received £5,987,000, losing £9,616,000.

Critical
The film was criticized for the performances (especially the accents), script, and choice to shoot a story of American history in England. Variety's staff commented "Watching Revolution is a little like visiting a museum – it looks good without really being alive. The film doesn’t tell a story so much as it uses characters to illustrate what the American Revolution has come to mean."

A reviewer for the UK-based Time Out called it "an almost inconceivable disaster which tries for a worm's eye view of the American Revolution...maybe the original script had a shape and a grasp of events. If so, it has gone. There has clearly been drastic cutting, and nothing is left but a cortège of fragments and mismatched cuts. It's also the first 70 mm movie that looks as if it was shot hand-held on 16 mm and blown up for the big screen. Director? I didn't catch the credit. Was there one?" Vincent Canby of The New York Times called it "a mess, but one that's so giddily misguided that it's sometimes a good deal of fun for all of the wrong reasons. Characters who have met briefly early in the film later stage hugely emotional, tearful reconciliations." Pauline Kael commented that "everything in this picture, which goes from the beginning of the American War of Independence in 1776 to the end of combat in 1783, seems dissociated. The director, Hugh Hudson, plunges us into gritty, muddy restagings of famous campaigns, but we don't find out what's going on in these campaigns, or what their importance is in the course of the war...Hudson and the scriptwriter, Robert Dillon, present the war as a primal Oedipal revolt of the Colonies against the parent country, and the relationships of the characters are designed in Oedipal pairs; Hudson also stages torture orgies to indicate how sadistic the redcoats are, and scenes are devised to set up echoes of the Rocky series and Rambo. This is a certifiably loony picture; it's so bad it puts you in a state of shock."

On Rotten Tomatoes, the film holds a rating of 10%, based on 20 reviews, and the consensus states: "Unlikely to inspire any fervor with its miscast ensemble and ponderous script, Revolution is a star-spangled bummer."

Accolades
Revolution was nominated for four Golden Raspberry Awards:
 Worst Picture
 Worst Director - Hugh Hudson
 Worst Actor - Al Pacino
 Worst Musical Score - John Corigliano

The film won the Stinkers Bad Movie Award for Worst Picture.

Director's cut
Revolution was rush-released in December 1985 for the Christmas market and for Academy Award consideration. Dissatisfied with the version of the film released to theatres, Hugh Hudson released Revolution: Revisited on DVD in 2009. This new cut added narration by Pacino (recorded for this release), and numerous scenes were trimmed or deleted outright (running at 115 minutes, the Director's Cut is approximately 10 minutes shorter than the theatrical version). Also included is a conversation with Pacino and Hudson who discussed the film's being rushed for a U.S. release during Christmas, being trashed by the critics, and having other issues related to the making and release of the film.

The film was re-released in the UK in 2012 by the British Film Institute in a Blu-ray Disc/DVD combo. This edition came with both cuts of the film, as well as a booklet with essays written by Nick Redman, Michael Brooke and critic Philip French, who argues that the film was a victim of bad publicity and cultural misunderstandings, and regards the 'Revisited' cut as a 'masterpiece'.

See also
 List of films about the American Revolution
 List of television series and miniseries about the American Revolution

References

Notes

External links
 
 
 
 
 
 BFI page on Revolution
 

 

1985 films
1980s adventure drama films
1980s historical drama films
1980s war drama films
American Revolutionary War films
British adventure drama films
British historical drama films
British war drama films
Films scored by John Corigliano
Films directed by Hugh Hudson
Films set in the 1770s
Films set in the 1780s
Films set in New York (state)
Films set in the Thirteen Colonies
Films shot in Devon
Films shot in Norfolk
Films produced by Irwin Winkler
Goldcrest Films films
War epic films
Warner Bros. films
1985 drama films
1980s English-language films
1980s British films